At the Top is an outdoor observation deck on the Burj Khalifa. It opened on 5 January 2010 on the 124th floor. At , it was the highest outdoor observation deck in the world when it opened. 

The 124th floor observation deck also features the electronic telescope, an augmented reality device developed by Gsmprjct° of Montréal, which allows visitors to view the surrounding landscape in real-time, and to view previously saved images such as those taken at different times of day or under different weather conditions. To reduce the daily rush of sightseers, management allows visitors to purchase tickets in advance for a specific date and time, at a 75% discount on tickets purchased on the spot.

On 8 February 2010, the observation deck was closed to the public for two months after power-supply problems caused an elevator to become stuck between floors, trapping a group of tourists for 45 minutes.

When the tide is low and visibility is high, people can see the shores of Iran from the top of the skyscraper.

SKY level 
The Burj Khalifa also opened another observation deck relating to At the Top, on the 148th floor, called the SKY level. This allowed the Burj Khalifa to have once again the title of the highest observation deck in the world, surpassing the Canton Tower in Guangzhou, although it was later surpassed by the Shanghai Tower.

It still holds the record for the highest outdoor terrace in the world, and the highest restaurant in the world.

References 

Observation decks
Tourist attractions in Dubai
Outdoor structures in the United Arab Emirates